The 2010–11 KHL season was the third season of the Kontinental Hockey League. It was held from 8 September 2010 and ended on 16 April 2011.

The season started with the Opening Cup game between the last season's finalists, Ak Bars Kazan and UHC Dynamo, the new team that was created by merging last season's Western conference winner HC MVD with Dynamo Moscow.

Salavat Yulaev Ufa won the Gagarin Cup and the Russian Championship after beating Atlant Moscow Oblast 4–1 in the play-off final series.

League changes

Team changes
Folding of Lada Togliatti

Lada Togliatti dropped out of the league and joined the Russian Major League instead, after failing to meet the league's financial requirements.

Merger of HC MVD and Dynamo Moscow

On 30 April 2010, it was announced that HC MVD would merge with Dynamo Moscow to form UHC Dynamo, which for the time being will play the majority of their games at Megasport Arena in Moscow, while also attempting to play some games in Balashikha. The current plan is to have a new, large and modernized arena constructed in Balashikha by 2012.

Expansion teams

By the deadline of 1 April 2010, six new teams from four different countries applied for KHL membership for this season: HC Yugra, Krylya Sovetov Moscow and Gazovik Tyumen from Russia; HC Budivelnyk from Kyiv, Ukraine; HC Lev from Hradec Králové, Czech Republic; and Vėtra Vilnius from Lithuania. Of these teams, Budivelnyk and Yugra were initially accepted into the KHL, but  on 24 June 2010 Budivelnyk announced it is unable to participate in the KHL in the 2010–11 season because their stadium is not ready. On 16 July 2010, HC Lev, which in the meantime has been moved to Poprad in Slovakia, was  accepted into the KHL, but after the Slovak Hockey Federation's delay to give permit to the team, the KHL excluded Lev from the 2010–11 season.

Other changes

Play-off format

Unlike in the previous seasons, all play-off series were played in a best-of-seven format.

Vuvuzelas ban

The KHL administration has explicitly banned the sale and use of vuvuzelas, infamous since the 2010 FIFA World Cup, in ice hockey arenas.

Regular season

The regular season started on 8 September 2010 with the Opening Cup and ended on 20 February 2011. There were short breaks in November, December and February for international matches and for the all-star game. Each team played 54 games during the regular season.

Notable events

Opening Cup

The first game of the season is traditionally the "Opening Cup" and is played between the two Gagarin Cup finalists from the previous season. Because previous season's runner-up HC MVD merged with Dynamo Moscow, the Opening Cup was played between defending champion Ak Bars Kazan and the newly formed UHC Dynamo. The game took place on 8 September 2010 at the TatNeft Arena in Kazan where UHC Dynamo beat Ak Bars Kazan 3–1.

KHL versus NHL exhibition games

The Carolina Hurricanes played SKA Saint Petersburg at the Ice Palace Saint Petersburg in Saint Petersburg, Russia on October 4 (SKA won 5–3), and the Phoenix Coyotes played Dinamo Riga at Arena Riga in Riga, Latvia on October 6 (Riga lost 1–3).

Game in Switzerland

On 23 December 2010, before the Spengler Cup started, the two participants from the KHL, SKA Saint Petersburg and Spartak Moscow, played an official regular-season game in the Vaillant Arena in Davos, Switzerland. It was the first KHL game played in central Europe.

All-Star Game

The All-Star weekend took place on 5 and 6 February 2011 in Saint Petersburg.

League standings

Source: KHL.ru

Points were awarded as follows:
3 Points for a win in regulation ("W")
2 Points for a win in overtime ("OTW") or penalty shootout ("SOW")
1 Point for a loss in a penalty shootout ("SOL") or overtime ("OTL")
0 Points for a loss in regulation ("L")

Conference standings

The conference standings determined the seedings for the play-offs. The first two places in each conference were reserved for the division winners.

Source: khl.ru

Source: khl.ru

Divisional standings
Western Conference

 

Eastern Conference

League leaders
Source: khl.ru

Goaltenders: minimum 15 games played

Scoring leaders
Source: khl.ru

  
GP = Games played; G = Goals; A = Assists; Pts = Points; +/– = Plus-minus; PIM = Penalty minutes

Leading goaltenders 
Source: khl.ru

GP = Games played; Min = Minutes played; W = Wins; L = Losses; SOL = Shootout losses; GA = Goals against; SO = Shutouts; SV% = Save percentage; GAA = Goals against average

Playoffs

The playoffs started on 23 February 2011. The fifth and final game of the final series for the Gagarin Cup was played on 16 April 2011.

Playoff leaders
Source: khl.ru

Goaltenders: minimum 5 games played

Scoring leaders
Source: khl.ru

  
GP = Games played; G = Goals; A = Assists; Pts = Points; +/– = Plus-minus; PIM = Penalty minutes

Leading goaltenders 
Source: khl.ru

GP = Games played; Min = Minutes played; W = Wins; L = Losses; SOL = Shootout losses; GA = Goals against; SO = Shutouts; SV% = Save percentage; GAA = Goals against average

Final standings

Awards

Players of the Month

Best KHL players of each month.

KHL Awards
On 20 May 2011, the KHL held their annual award ceremony. A total of 20 different awards were handed out to teams, players, officials and media. The most important trophies are listed in the table below.

The league also awarded six "Golden Helmets" for the members of the all-star team:

References
KHL regular season calendar in English
KHL playoffs format in English
KHL Official Rulebook in Russian

 
Kontinental Hockey League seasons
1
1